Mary Angela Kelly, LVO (born 4 November 1957, Liverpool) is a British fashion designer, dressmaker, and milliner, who served as Personal Assistant and Senior Dresser to Queen Elizabeth II from 2002 until the monarch's death in 2022.  Her official title was Personal Assistant, Adviser and Curator to Her Majesty The Queen (Jewellery, Insignias and Wardrobe).

Early life
Kelly was born in Liverpool, as the daughter of a dock worker and a nurse.

Career

Kelly first began working for the Queen after gaining employment as The Queen’s Dresser following an interview at Windsor Castle in 1994.  
She was responsible for the Queen's clothes, jewellery and insignia, researching the venues for royal visits as well as the significance of different colours, in order to create appropriate outfits for the monarch. In 2019, Kelly announced that The Queen would only wear faux-furs.

Notable creations by Kelly include:
 The replica of the royal christening gown. The original, which had been commissioned by Queen Victoria for the christening of her first child, Victoria, Princess Royal, was retired in 2004 by Elizabeth II for conservation purposes. Kelly's replica has been worn by royal babies for their christenings since 2008.
 The Queen's outfit for the wedding of Prince William, Duke of Cambridge, and Catherine Middleton; a primrose-yellow double crepe wool coat and matching wool dress, with hand-sewn beading at the neck in the shape of sunrays.
 Princess Beatrice and Princess Eugenie's outfits for the wedding of Zara Phillips.
 Together with British fashion designer Stewart Parvin, Kelly altered, remodeled and fitted the dress that Princess Beatrice of York wore at her wedding to Edoardo Mapelli Mozzi on 17 July 2020.  The original dress was designed by the British fashion designer Norman Hartnell, who had originally created it for Queen Elizabeth II, the bride's grandmother, in the 1960s.

Other work
Kelly founded a fashion label, Kelly & Pordum, with Alison Pordum, who was also employed as the Queen's in-house dressmaker until 2008. Kelly is also the author of Dressing the Queen: The Jubilee Wardrobe and The Other Side of the Coin: The Queen, the Dresser and the Wardrobe.

Honours
In 2006, she was appointed a Member of the Royal Victorian Order (MVO), and promoted to Lieutenant of the same Order (LVO) in 2012. She was awarded the Queen Elizabeth II Version of the Royal Household Long and Faithful Service Medal in 2014 for 20 years of service to the Royal Family. With other members of the royal household, she attended the state funeral of Queen Elizabeth II on 19 September, 2022.

Bibliography

References

1967 births
Living people
People from Liverpool
British fashion designers
Lieutenants of the Royal Victorian Order
Designers from Merseyside